The 2019 Pulitzer Prizes were awarded by the Pulitzer Prize Board for work during the 2018 calendar year. Prize winners and nominated finalists were announced by administrator Dana Canedy at 3:00 p.m. EST on April 15, 2019.

The Washington Post won two prizes, as did The New York Times; The Wall Street Journal won one; and the Sun-Sentinel won its second Pulitzer for Public Service.

Journalism

Letters, Drama, and Music

Special citations

Two special citations were awarded in 2019, as follows:

References 

2019
Columbia University Graduate School of Journalism
2019 literary awards
2019 awards in the United States
2019 music awards
April 2019 events in the United States